Ronnachai Jungwongsuk (born 4 March 1997) is a Thai futsal defender, and currently a member of  Thailand national futsal team.

References

Ronnachai Jungwongsuk
Ronnachai Jungwongsuk
Southeast Asian Games medalists in futsal
Competitors at the 2017 Southeast Asian Games
Ronnachai Jungwongsuk
1997 births
Living people
Futsal defenders
Competitors at the 2021 Southeast Asian Games
Ronnachai Jungwongsuk